Iliya Pavlov Naydenov (August 6, 1960 – March 7, 2003) was a Bulgarian businessman. A banker, financier, philanthropist and reputed Bulgarian mafia boss, he was the leader and founder of the Multigroup organization and G-13. Pavlov was ranked the eighth richest man in Central and Eastern Europe by the Polish magazine Wprost in 2002. He was said to be worth $US1.5 billion. He was married to Darina Pavlova, who inherited his fortune after his murder.

Death
Pavlov was shot outside his office with a single bullet to the heart by a sniper and died instantly. The day before his death, he had testified in the trial of the accused murderers of Andrey Lukanov, Bulgaria's first prime minister after the fall of communism who died in 1996. Pavlov had claimed that he had no conflict with Lukanov.

No one has been charged in Pavlov's murder and while several possible theories have been put forth the motive is unknown. A previous attempt on Pavlov's life was made in 1997 when a bomb destroyed his car. He was not in it at the time.

In 2010 Pavlov's sister, Slavka Naydenova, and her 8-year-old son were murdered in Dale City, Virginia. A Russian-American woman who was the wife of Naydenova's ex-husband pleaded guilty to the murders. The motive was jealousy.

Sports career
Pavlov was a former Bulgarian wrestling champion  who graduated from the National Sports Academy in Sofia.

See also
List of Bulgarians
List of unsolved murders
Bulgarian mafia

References

1960 births
2003 deaths
20th-century Bulgarian businesspeople
Assassinated Bulgarian people
Bulgarian billionaires
Deaths by firearm in Bulgaria
Male murder victims
Murdered Bulgarian gangsters
People from Sofia City Province
People murdered in Bulgaria
Sportspeople from Sofia
Unsolved murders in Bulgaria
2003 murders in Bulgaria